The 1986 Eastern Illinois Panthers football team represented Eastern Illinois University as a member of the Gateway Collegiate Athletic Conference (GCAC) during the 1986 NCAA Division I-AA football season. Led by fourth-year head coach Al Molde, the Panthers played their home games at O'Brien Stadium in Charleston, Illinois. Eastern Illinois finished the season with an overall record of 11–2 and won the GCAC title with a mark of 5–1 in conference play.

Schedule

References

Eastern Illinois
Eastern Illinois Panthers football seasons
Missouri Valley Football Conference champion seasons
Eastern Illinois Panthers football